Disca arborita is a moth of the family Erebidae first described by Michael Fibiger in 2007. It is known from Sumatra.

The wingspan is 11–12 mm. The forewing is relatively broad. The hindwing is light brown and the underside unicolorous light brown.

References

Micronoctuini
Moths described in 2007
Taxa named by Michael Fibiger